Elections to Rossendale Borough Council were held on 6 May 2021, as part of the wider 2021 UK local elections.

Councillors elected in 2016 were defending their seats this year, and they will be contested again in 2024. The Labour Party lost control of the council, however they continue to run a minority administration.

Results summary

Ward results

Cribden

Eden

Facit & Shawforth

Goodshaw

Greenfield

Greensclough

Hareholme

Helmshore

Irwell

Longholme

Stacksteads

Whitewell

Worsley

References

2021
Rossendale
2020s in Lancashire